

Mountain ranges of Turkey 

 Taurus Mountains range across southern Turkey between the coast and the Anatolian Plateau.  Subranges include
Akdağlar (or White Mountains) are in the south-western 
Beydağlar (or Bey Mountains)
Tahtalı Mountain Range south west Anatolia
 Anti-Taurus Mountains (Aladağlar) are in southern and eastern Turkey
 Cilo-Sat Mountains are the eastern extension of the Taurus Mountains and are in Hakkari province
Nur Mountains (South Anatolia)
 Pontic Mountains (in Turkish, Kuzey Anadolu Dağları, meaning North Anatolian Mountains) range along the southern coast of the Black Sea in northern Turkey
 Kaçkar Mountains form the eastern end of the Pontic Mountains
 Köroğlu Mountains (Northwest Anatolia)
 Yıldız Mountains (Istranca or Strandzha) are in the European part of Turkey and in Bulgaria
 Sultan Mountains on the western edge of the Anatolian Plateau
 Yalnızçam Mountains in the Eastern Anatolia Region

Mountains of Turkey

Gallery

References

Turkey
Mountains
Turkey
Turkey